The Austrian motorcycle Grand Prix is a motorcycling event that was part of the Grand Prix motorcycle racing season from 1971 to 1997, and then again from 2016 onwards. The event is due to take place at the Red Bull Ring until at least 2025.

History
The inaugural Austrian grand prix was held in 1971 at the Salzburgring, where it stayed until 1994. In 1995, the Austrian GP was taken off the calendar because the Salzburgring was deemed too dangerous for racing., but would return in 1996 on the then-called Österreichring. In 1997, the Österreichring became the A1-Ring, named after the Austrian mobile network operator A1.

For the 1998 season, the Austrian round was scrapped, mainly due to the low number of spectators who visited the races.

After a 19-year absence, the Austrian Grand Prix returned in 2016 and currently takes place at the Red Bull Ring in Spielberg. The layout was changed, and a chicane was added before the 2022 race.

Track gallery

Official names and sponsors
1971, 1986–1991: Großer Preis von Österreich (no official sponsor)
1972: Grosser Preis von Österreich (no official sponsor)
1973–1977: Austrian Grand Prix/Grosser Preis von Österreich (no official sponsor)
1978–1979, 1981–1985: Austrian Grand Prix/Großer Preis von Österreich (no official sponsor)
1993: Austrian Grand Prix (no official sponsor)
1994: Grand Prix Austria (no official sponsor)
1996: HB Motorrad Grand Prix Austria
1997: Motorrad Grand Prix von Österreich (no official sponsor)
2016–2017: NeroGiardini Motorrad Grand Prix von Österreich
2018: Eyetime Motorrad Grand Prix von Österreich
2019–2020: myWorld Motorrad Grand Prix von Österreich
2021: Bitci Motorrad Grand Prix von Österreich
2022–present: CryptoData Motorrad Grand Prix von Österreich

Winners of the Austrian motorcycle Grand Prix

Multiple winners (riders)

Multiple winners (manufacturers)

By year

Footnotes

References

 

 
Recurring sporting events established in 1971
1971 establishments in Austria